Tankaman-e Shomali Rural District is in Tankaman District of Nazarabad County, Alborz province, Iran. At the time of the 2006 census, this region and that of Tankaman-e Jonubi Rural District before their creation were a part of Tankaman Rural District (then in Tehran province), whose total population was 16,310 in 4,135 households. At the most recent census of 2016, Tankaman-e Shomali had a population of 10,790 people in 3,302 households. The largest of its 15 villages was Bakhtiar, with 3,520 people.

References 

Nazarabad County

Districts of Alborz Province

Populated places in Alborz Province

Populated places in Nazarabad County

fa:دهستان تنکمان شمالي